One Day is a novel by David Nicholls, published in 2009. Each chapter covers the lives of two protagonists on 15 July, St Swithin's Day, for 20 years. The novel attracted generally positive reviews and was named 2010 Galaxy Book of the Year. Nicholls adapted his book into a screenplay; the feature film, was released in August 2011, and a planned television series for Netflix.

Plot
Dexter and Emma spend the night together following their graduation from the University of Edinburgh, in 1988. They talk about how they will be once they are 40. While they do not become romantically involved completely, this is the beginning of their friendship. The novel visits their lives and their relationship on 15 July in successive years in each chapter, for 20 years. 

Emma wants to improve the world, and begins writing and performing plays, which remain unsuccessful, while Dexter travels through the world, drinking and hooking up with women. Eventually both move to London, where Emma becomes a waitress in Kentish Town, at a Tex-Mex restaurant, while Dexter becomes a successful television presenter.

While there are various attempts from both sides to start a relationship, coincidences stop Emma and Dexter from getting together, and while they have relationships with other people, they remain best friends, each secretly longing for the other. They are drawn closer through a holiday together and the death of Dexter's mother.

Emma breaks up with her boyfriend, Ian, after realising she is creating a life with someone she doesn't love. During this time she is able to find a job as a teacher, after various years of struggle, despite having a "double-first degree". Dexter, meanwhile, develops a drinking and drug problem, and watches his career collapse. 

Emma and Dexter's friendship grows increasingly difficult after Emma is constantly hurt by Dexter, who attempts to hide his feelings for her from both her and himself. 
Finally, after being treated rudely by Dexter at a restaurant, Emma breaks up the friendship.

At the wedding of Emma's former roommate, Emma and Dexter meet again. Emma admits that she wants Dexter back. At this juncture, she has just ended an affair with the headmaster of the school she teaches in, and Dexter has fallen in love with another woman, Sylvie, who is pregnant. At this reunion, Dexter invites Emma, who is disappointed by the situation, to his wedding.

Emma tries to overcome her problems and begins to write, while Dexter is unemployed and overwhelmed by his role as a father after his divorce from Sylvie, who was having an affair. Emma leaves to go to Paris in the hope of writing a sequel to her first successful children's novel. When Dexter visits her in Paris, he learns that she has met someone and likes him, and for the first time admits his feelings to her. After talking about their relationship, Emma chooses Dexter.

Emma and Dexter form a relationship, are happy together, and get married, but Emma wants a child. The couple finds themselves frustrated by their failing attempts to have a child. Dexter, however, is able to open a deli-café and finds himself on his way back to being successful.

On the anniversary of the day they met after graduation and the day they got together, Emma and Dexter have an appointment to see a house. While travelling there, Emma has a bike accident and dies. After her death, Dexter finds himself in despair. He starts to drink again and provokes people in bars to get beaten.

He is comforted by his ex-wife Sylvie, his father, and his daughter. Three years after Emma's death Dexter travels with his daughter to Edinburgh, where he and Emma met, and they climb the same hill together that he and Emma climbed 19 years earlier.

The book ends with a vivid and lingering memory of what happened after that day together 20 years before: their goodbye kiss after the evening, promise to stay in touch, and goodbye.

Major themes
Nicholls recalls that idea for the novel had its origin when he was a student, reading a passage in Thomas Hardy's 1891 novel Tess of the D'Urbervilles in which Hardy's heroine realises that as well as birthdays and anniversaries "there was yet another date, of greater importance to her than those; that of her own death...a day which lay sly and unseen and among all the other days of the year, giving no sign or sound." Twenty years later, Nicholls found himself adapting Hardy's novel for the BBC and was reminded of the passage; "There it was again; that ordinary day that turns out not to be ordinary at all." This gave the author the idea for a novel in which the date of a major character's death should form the basis for vignettes of the characters' lives, without the events of the other 364 days, and thus avoiding the cliches of birthdays, Valentine's Day or New Year's Eve. St Swithun's Day (15 July) was chosen as it fitted with the graduation day at which the reader first encounters the characters and the "themes of unpredictability" of the proverb.

Writing in The Times, John O'Connell writes, "For, in spite of its comic gloss, One Day is really about loneliness and the casual savagery of fate; the tragic gap between youthful aspiration and the compromises that we end up tolerating. Not for nothing has Nicholls said that it was inspired by Thomas Hardy." A critic in The London Paper observes that One Day "may be a love story, but it's no fairytale: Nicholls doesn’t shy from the harsh side of growing up, the disillusionment, regrets, and random cruelty of life.". According to Jonathan Coe, writing in "Guardian Books of the Year" (2009), "It's rare to find a novel which ranges over the recent past with such authority, and even rarer to find one in which the two leading characters are drawn with such solidity, such painful fidelity, to real life."

Reception
The novel attracted mainly positive reviews. Writing in The Guardian, Harry Ritchie called it "a very persuasive and endearing account of a close friendship – the delight Emma and Dexter take in one another, the flirting and the banter that sometimes hide resentment and sometimes yearning, the way the relationship shifts and evolves as the years pass." Ritchie comments, "Just as Nicholls has made full use of his central concept, so he has drawn on all his comic and literary gifts to produce a novel that is not only roaringly funny but also memorable, moving and, in its own unassuming, unpretentious way, rather profound." This story is reminiscent of Same Time, Next Year.

Elizabeth Day of The Observer also praises the novel, although criticising "its structural flaws", since "some of the most important events in their life are never recounted." Despite this, she concludes by commenting "there is no doubt that One Day is a beguiling read. But although I really liked it, I wanted desperately to love it because Nicholls is, I think, a far better writer than this format allows him to be."

The Times deflected comparisons to When Harry Met Sally..., "saccharine" assumptions, and expectations that the "more literary" will snobbishly gratify themselves that they never read "'commercial' romantic comedies with cartoons and squiggly writing on the cover. Well, be convinced: One Day is a wonderful, wonderful book: wise, funny, perceptive, compassionate and often unbearably sad. It's also, with its subtly political focus on changing habits and mores, the best British social novel since Jonathan Coe's What a Carve Up."

Author Nick Hornby also praised the book on his blog, calling it "A big, absorbing, smart, fantastically readable on-off love story." His blurb is used in some editions of the book, such as the US paperback edition.

In 2010, the novel was named Popular Fiction Book of the Year at the UK's annual Galaxy National Book Awards ceremony, and was later granted the accolade of Galaxy Book of the Year.

Adaptations

Feature film

At the time of the book's publication, Nicholls wrote that he was adapting his novel as a film script. He acknowledged the difficulties in casting people who "could be both students and middle-aged! But I think we've found a way."

The film was directed by Lone Scherfig for Random House Films and Focus Features, with a theatrical release in August 2011. Anne Hathaway and Jim Sturgess portrayed Emma and Dexter, respectively. Filming took place in England, Scotland, and France.

Television series

In November 2021, it was announced that Netflix will be adapting the novel into a television series. The writing team for the series is headed by Nicole Taylor, working with Anna Jordan, Vinay Patel and Bijan Sheibani and will be produced by Drama Republic, Universal International Studios and Focus Features. Ambika Mod and Leo Woodall are set to star as lead roles.

References

External links
Iain Hollingshead and Bryony Gordon (6 Aug 2011). "One Day: the best novel ever – or a tedious schmaltz-fest?". The Telegraph. Retrieved 2011-08-17.
Schillinger, Liesl (18 June 2010).  The Love Not Taken. The NY Times. Retrieved 2011-08-17.

2009 British novels
British novels adapted into films
British novels adapted into television shows
Novels about friendship
Hodder & Stoughton books
Novels by David Nicholls